Zecco is a department or commune of Nahouri Province in south-eastern Burkina Faso. Its capital lies at the town of Zecco. It comes from the  Frafra name Zẽkɔ

References

Departments of Burkina Faso
Nahouri Province